The Princess Guide may refer to:

 The Princess Guide (The Simpsons), episode of The Simpsons
 The Princess Guide (video game), 2018 action role-playing game